Joon, also spelled Jun, Chun, or June, is a rare Korean family name, as well as a common element in Korean given names.

As a family name
The family name Joon is written with only one hanja, meaning. The 2000 South Korean Census found 72 people with this family name. All belonged to one bon-gwan, from Cheongju.

In given names
There are 34 hanja with the reading "Joon" on the South Korean government's official list of hanja which may be used in given names; the more common ones are listed in the table above.

Single-syllable given name
People with the given name Joon include:
Heo Jun (c. 1537 – 1615), Joseon Dynasty court physician
Yi Tjoune (1859–1907), late Joseon Dynasty and Korean Empire diplomat
Choe Jun (1884–1970), South Korean businessman
Oh Joon (born 1955), South Korean diplomat
Heo Jun (television personality) (born 1977), South Korean television personality
Jung Joon (born 1979), South Korean actor
Mun Jun (born 1982), South Korean speed skater
Park June (born 1986), South Korean professional computer gamer
Kwon Jun (born 1987), South Korean footballer
Ahn Jun (fl. 2000s), South Korean photographer

People with the stage name "Joon" include:
Kim Joon (Kim Hyung-joon, born 1984), South Korean rapper, former member of boy group T-max
Lee Joon (Lee Chang-sun, born 1988), South Korean singer, former member of boy group MBLAQ
Jun. K (Kim Min-joon, born 1988), South Korean singer-songwriter, member of boy group 2PM
Wen Junhui (born 1996), Chinese singer, member of South Korean boy group Seventeen

As name element
A few names containing this syllable have been popular over the years. Jun-young and Joon-ho were popular names for newborn boys in the 1970s through 1990s. In the late 2000s and early 2010s, more names containing this syllable became popular, including Min-jun, Jun-seo, Ye-jun, Hyun-jun, and Seo-jun.

Names beginning with this syllable include:

Jun-ha
Joon-hee
Joon-ho
Joon-hyuk
Joon-ki
Jun-sang
Jun-seo
Jun-seok
Joon-tae
Joon-young

Names ending with this syllable include:

Byung-joon
Dong-jun
Ha-joon
Hee-joon
Ho-jun
Hyun-jun
Hyung-joon
Jae-joon
Kyung-joon
Min-jun
Myung-jun
Sang-jun
Seo-jun
Seung-jun
Ye-jun
Yong-joon
Young-jun

See also
Pieter Joon (born 1942), Dutch athlete, founder of World Organization Volleyball for Disabled
Joon Wolfsberg (born 1992), German singer-songwriter

References

Korean-language surnames